Anguispira cumberlandiana, the Cumberland tigersnail or the Cumberland disc, is a species of small, air-breathing land snail, a terrestrial pulmonate gastropod mollusk in the family Discidae.

This species is found along the Cumberland Plateau, United States.

Original descriptions from the 1840s
Anguispira cumberlandiana was originally discovered and described under the name Carocolla Cumberlandiana by Isaac Lea in 1840.

Lea's original text (the type description) reads as follows and provided one sentence of physical description. He lists the location of specimens as in the Cumberland Mountains near Jasper, Tennessee:
	

	
Later, in 1843, Lea provided the same description, but with more background information about the body form of this species in relation to H. alternata (now known as Anguispira alternata), particularly the lenticular form and carina of cumberlandiana.

References
This article incorporates public domain text from references.

Discidae
Gastropods described in 1840